Aubrey Cummings (1947 – 14 April 2010) was a renowned Guyanese musician and singer, who in 1978 migrated to Barbados. He was also an artist.

Biography
Aubrey Augustus Cummings was born in 1947 and grew up in the Alberttown/Queenstown neighborhoods of Georgetown. He attended Queenstown Roman Catholic Primary School during the headmastership of Francis Percival Loncke.

He joined the group Bumble and the Saints in 1965. He went on to be the lead singer for the Rhythmnaires and the Dominators, also playing rhythm guitar and doing arrangements.<ref name=teenidol>"Aubrey Augustus Cummings: Teen-idol, Colleague, Friend", 'Kaieteur News, 9 May 2010.</ref> He left the Dominators in 1973 and helped form another band called the Telstars, having a popular hit with "So Lucky in My Life". The Telstars toured Brazil, later visiting Barbados and recording their album Orbiting, and in 1975 Cummings returned for six months to Brazil, where he was well received in Rio and Brasilia. 

In 1978, Cummings migrated to Barbados, and built an active career as a guitarist and vocalist — musicians he played with include John Roett, Charlie King, Nicholas Branker, and Johnny Glasgow (Linus Yaw) — and subsequently established himself as a painter.

His CD Moon Over Me was issued in 2005.

He was found dead in his car at Haggatt Hall, Saint Michael, Barbados, on the evening of 14 April 2010.

 References 

External links
 Stanley Greaves, "Remembering Aubrey Cummings", Stabroek News'', April 25, 2010.

1947 births
2010 deaths
Barbadian male singers
20th-century Guyanese male singers
Guyanese artists
People from Georgetown, Guyana
21st-century Guyanese male singers